U.S. Route 54 (US 54) in Illinois is a  east–west highway that travels from the Champ Clark Bridge on the Missouri state line to I-72/US 36/IL 107 south of Griggsville. At its greatest extent, US 54 used to continue east to Springfield, then northeast to Onarga, and then north all the way to Downtown Chicago.

Route description
Beginning at the Champ Clark Bridge above the Mississippi River, US 54 travels in a northeastern direction. It then intersects IL 96 in Atlas and then travels in a northern direction. Along the way, US 54 comes across Lyman Scott House in Summer Hill. In New Hartford, the route then travels in a northeastern direction again. After that, it begins to run concurrently with IL 106 all the way toward Pittsfield. In Pittsfield, one block east of Pike County Courthouse, US 54 splits northward. After leaving Pittsfield, the route comes across I-72/US 36/IL 107. At this point, US 54 terminates at this diamond interchange.

History

Initially, US 54 ended at the junction of present-day IL 106 (former portion of US 36). In 1935, it replaced a portion of IL 107 between Louisiana, Missouri and New Hartford, Illinois. From 1942 to 1971, US 54 traveled all the way to Downtown Chicago. It then got truncated back to its previous eastern terminus. This was in favor of portions of US 36, Illinois Route 54, US 45, Illinois Route 50, Governors Highway, Wood Street, 127th Street, Halsted Street, Vincennes Avenue, State Street, and Michigan Avenue. The four-lane section of US 36 northeast of Pittsfield now also carries Interstate 72 east to Springfield. As of 1992, US 54 was extended northeast to US 36 and present-day I-72 (exit 35). That same year, the section of road that once carried Illinois Route 54 through Springfield is no longer designated as a numbered highway. Now Illinois Route 54 starts at the Interstate 55 exit and goes northeast to Onarga, where it ends at U.S. Route 45. US 54 once joined with US 45 to Kankakee, but that highway is now designated as US 45 alone to Gilman, then US 45 and US 24 through Gilman, then US 45 alone again until a four-way intersection with U.S. Route 52 and Illinois Route 49, and US 45 and US 52 through Kankakee. Between Kankakee and Monee, the section that once carried US 54 is now marked as Illinois Route 50.

Major intersections

Reference

External links

 Illinois